The women's 200 metre breaststroke event at the 2012 Summer Olympics took place on 1–2 August 2012 at the London Aquatics Centre in London, United Kingdom.

U.S. swimmer Rebecca Soni cleared a 2:20-barrier in a remarkable world record to defend her Olympic title for the first time in the event's history. Dominating the race from the start, she threw down a stunning time of 2:19.59 to open up a full-body length gap over the rest of the field on the final stretch. Meanwhile, Japan's Satomi Suzuki powered home with silver in a scorching time of 2:20.72 to match an Asian record previously held by Rie Kaneto in 2009. Russia's Yuliya Yefimova, who trained with Soni at the Trojan Swim Club, snatched the bronze medal with an astonishing European record in 2:20.92.

Denmark's Rikke Pedersen fell short of the podium by almost a full second with a fourth-place time in 2:21.65, and was followed in fifth by Canada's Martha McCabe (2:23.16) and sixth by Soni's teammate Micah Lawrence (2:23.27). South Africa's Suzaan van Biljon got off to a flying start in the first length, but dropped back to seventh in 2:23.72, while Australia's Sally Foster rounded out the field to eighth in 2:26.00.

Before the breakthrough finale, Soni scorched the field with a world-record time in 2:20.00 to pick up a top seed in the semifinals, slicing 0.12 seconds off the standard set by Canada's Annamay Pierse in a since-banned high tech bodysuit from the 2009 World Championships.

Other notable swimmers missed the final roster featuring Serbia's Nađa Higl, the 2009 world champion; Norway's Sara Nordenstam, the defending bronze medalist; and Jamaica's Alia Atkinson, fourth-place finalist in the 100 m breaststroke.

Records
Prior to this competition, the existing world and Olympic records were as follows.

The following records were established during the competition:

Results

Heats

Semifinals

Semifinal 1

Semifinal 2

Final

References

External links
NBC Olympics Coverage

Women's 00200 metre breaststroke
2012 in women's swimming
Women's events at the 2012 Summer Olympics